The 1908 United States presidential election in New Jersey took place on November 3, 1908. All contemporary 46 states were part of the 1908 United States presidential election. Voters chose 14 electors to the Electoral College, which selected the president and vice president.

New Jersey was won by the Republican nominees, United States Secretary of War William Howard Taft of Ohio and his running mate Congressman James S. Sherman of New York. Taft and Sherman defeated the Democratic nominees, former Congressman and two-time prior presidential candidate William Jennings Bryan of Nebraska and his running mate Senator John W. Kern of Indiana.  Also in the running was the Socialist Party candidate, Eugene V. Debs, who ran with Ben Hanford.

Taft carried New Jersey comfortably with 56.80 percent of the vote to Bryan's 39.07 percent, a victory margin of 17.72 percent.

Eugene Debs came in a distant third, with 2.19 percent.

Like much of the Northeast, New Jersey in the early decades of the 20th century was a staunchly Republican state, having not given a majority of the vote to a Democratic presidential candidate since 1892. While winning a comfortable victory nationwide, Taft easily held New Jersey in the Republican column in 1908. On the county-level map, Taft carried 18 of the state's 21 counties, breaking 60% of the vote in 8 counties. Bryan won only the three rural counties in western North Jersey, Warren, Sussex, and Hunterdon, which had long been non-Yankee Democratic enclaves in the otherwise Republican Northeast.

New Jersey's election result in 1908 made the state over 9% more Republican than the national average. This is the last time a Republican won the election without Hunterdon, Warren, and Sussex counties.

Results

Results by county

See also
 Presidency of William Howard Taft
 United States presidential elections in New Jersey

References

New Jersey
1908
1908 New Jersey elections